Basellandschaftliche Zeitung (English:  Basellandschaftliche Newspaper), or bz, is a Swiss Standard German language daily newspaper, published by Luedin in Liestal, Basel-Landschaft. Its editor-in-chief is Franz C. Widmer. It is the second largest daily newspaper in the Basel region (behind the Basler Zeitung).

Covering the Basel region, its daily circulation in 2004 stood at 23,500 and the Wednesday edition's circulation at 81,000 (WEMF, 2004).

The Basellandschaftliche Zeitung was founded in 1854 as a mouthpiece for the political establishment.

See also
 List of newspapers in Switzerland

External links 
 bzbasel.ch (in German), the newspaper's official website

Year of establishment missing
Daily newspapers published in Switzerland
German-language newspapers published in Switzerland
Liestal
Mass media in Basel